Narmetta is a village and a mandal in Jangaon district in the state of Telangana in India. MLA Nimma Raji Reddy is From Narmetta Mandal, Veldanda Village.  
There was Encounter occurred in December 1991 between people's war and Police and died many people in front of police station.  Great people from Narmetta 
Nimma Venkat Reddy, Gangula Sanjeeva Reddy, Nimma Raji Reddy, Nimma Lacchavva, Pathuri Malla Reddy, Malladi Upender Reddy

Panchayats
The village panchayats in Narmetta mandal include Veldanda, Agapet, Ammapuram, Bommakur, Ippalagadda, Gandiramaram, Gunturpally, Hanmantapur, Kanneboinagudem, Malkapet and Machupahad.
Veldenda is a major village.

References 

Villages in Jangaon district
Mandals in Jangaon district